Bonnie Aarons is an American actress and writer. She is best known for her roles as the bum in Mulholland Drive (2001), Baroness Joy von Troken in The Princess Diaries (2001) and its sequel, The Princess Diaries 2: Royal Engagement (2004), and the demon nun known as Valak in The Conjuring 2 (2016) and its subsequent spinoff, The Nun (2018). She appeared in the 2018 movie Adi Shankar's Gods and Secrets.

Career
Aarons attended acting school in New York City, but was frequently told that she would not have an acting career, due to her look and her nose. She found work in Europe doing short films and commercials. Her first American film was 1994's Exit to Eden, portraying a prostitute. She then appeared in the Roger Corman-produced "woman in prison" film, Caged Heat 3000.

Aarons has played small roles in several horror movies, such as I Know Who Killed Me, Drag Me to Hell, The Conjuring 2, and Mulholland Drive.

In 2022, it was announced that Aarons will be starring in the horror film Camp Pleasant Lake with Michael Paré and Jonathan Lipnicki.

Filmography

Film

Television

References

External links
 

American film actresses
Living people
20th-century American actresses
21st-century American actresses
Year of birth missing (living people)